Al Murray's Multiple Personality Disorder is a British sketch show starring comedian Al Murray. The multi character aspect of the show was a departure from Murray's previous television comedy work, as the sole character The Pub Landlord. The show ran from 27 February to 12 April 2009, airing in the Friday night prime time slot on ITV & UTV. STV in Scotland did not broadcast the programme. It was commissioned on 4 June 2008.

Characters 
Ueber bomb führer Horst Schwul (Murray) – A camp, gay, Nazi officer (Schwul being German for gay)
Barrington Blowtorch – Victorian gentleman thief Barrington Blowtorch (Murray) who talks his way out of trouble when caught by the inspector (Wall) by using unbelievable stories.
Gary Parsley (Murray) – A demanding, extravagant, flamboyant pop star whose career peaked in the 1970s. He is from Billericay and based on Elton John.
Peter Taylor (Murray and Eclair) – A husband and wife obsessed with sex who constantly embarrass their daughter and her boyfriend. He has a prominent West Country accent.
Gay Best Friend (Murray) – Gaz, the Geordie pretending to be gay to get closer to a girl friend.
Mobile phone shop assistants (Brodkin and Murray) – Two chavs (the cashier and his boss) who epitomise Britain's poor quality of customer service.
Jason Bent (Brodkin and Murray) – A stereotypical Premier League footballer with a Scouse accent (Brodkin), speaking to the post match interviewer after the game (Murray).
Duncan's Den' – (Bannatyne as himself, Solon, Murray) A businessman, Duncan Bannatyne, plays himself, looking to invest £1 million in business venture. A parody of Dragons' Den, where the only ever contestant is hapless young divorcée Carole Price, interviewed by host (Murray).
The Celeb News Tramps – Two homeless people who are up to date on all the celebrity stories as they sleep under tabloid newspapers.
The PC P.C.s – (several) This spoof of The Bill satirises the excessive political correctness in the British police force.
Lee Nelson (Brodkin) – A chav walking his dog who philosophises on life.
The Radio Ad Couple (Murray and Eclair) a couple who only ever converse in the style of radio advertisements.
Intolerant Vicar (Murray) A vicar who is constantly outraged at the inappropriate untraditional song selection for services.
Roger Dennis (Murray) A pilot whose pre-takeoff announcements are always inappropriate.
Big Baby  (Murray) A life-size baby as an executive businessman.
Wayne Upman (Murray) A man who has always had it harder than anybody relating a bad experience to him.

Writers 
Al Murray
Simon Brodkin
Mark Augustyn
John Camm
Chris England
Paul Hawksbee
Tony MacMurray
Will Maclean
Daniel Maier
Matt Simpson
Laura Solon
Paul Powell

Supporting cast 
Simon Brodkin
Jenny Eclair
Sadie Hasler
Colin Hoult
Laura Solon
Kim Wall
Katy Wix

Guest appearances 
 Rebecca Front – Police boss (ep 1)
 Peter Davison – Doctor (ep 4)
 Michael Winner – self (ep 6)
 Sylvester McCoy – various (ep 6)
 Sally Lindsay – various (ep 6)
 John Barrowman – Camp American Airman (ep 7)

Critical reception
Al Murray's Multiple Personality Disorder provoked considerable controversy, receiving very sharp criticism from some quarters of the press, whilst attracting positive reviews from others. In particular, a scathing review of the show by Tim Teeman was published in The Times, berating the show for its perceived homophobia due to the characterisation of Horst Schwul:

This view was backed up by The Scotsman, which described the characters as "crass" and "one-dimensional", and describing Schwul as "undoubtedly the worst comedy character in the history of civilisation".

By contrast,  the Daily Mirror gave the show a broadly positive review,  praising Murray and Eclair's performance as the Radio Ad Couple, and suggesting the show demonstrates that "the spirit of Benny Hill lives on". The Daily Telegraph noted that, whilst "parts of it may be too crude for some tastes... there are some winning ideas", whilst The Independent also enjoyed several sketches.<ref>Tom Sutcliffe. The Weekend's Television... The Independent. 2 March 2009.</ref>

However, The Stage'' was disappointed with the show, describing it as "very lazy comedy...dependent upon ridiculous costumes and cod accents to get laughs".

References

Further reading 
 Al Murray reveals new characters

External links

Show reviews at Al Murray's official site

2009 British television series debuts
2009 British television series endings
2000s British LGBT-related comedy television series
2000s British television sketch shows
English-language television shows
ITV sketch shows
Television series by ITV Studios